John Dunne (21 January 1846 – 25 December 1916) was a Roman Catholic bishop.  He was the first bishop of the Diocese of Wilcannia in New South Wales, Australia.

Dunne was born in Rhode, King's County, Ireland. He studied for the priesthood at Carlow College and was a priest of the Sydney archdiocese. His relative John Dunne, then Vicar-General of Goulburn, requested that Dunne be devoted to the Diocese of Goulburn. The request was granted by Archdeacon John Polding and the newly promoted priest worked for 16 years in Goulburn. Dunne was consecrated the first Bishop of Wilcannia on 14 August 1887 at Goulburn Cathedral, a position he retained until his death.

Dunne's uncle, Patrick Dunne, was an Irish-born priest who also ministered in Australia.

References

1846 births
1916 deaths
Alumni of Carlow College
Irish emigrants to colonial Australia
Roman Catholic bishops of Wilcannia–Forbes
People from County Offaly
Irish expatriate Catholic bishops
20th-century Roman Catholic bishops in Australia